Leonard M. "Slim" Carter (February 29, 1901 – June 27, 1950) was a college basketball player for the Alabama Crimson Tide under coach Hank Crisp. An All-Southern center, he captained the team in 1924 and 1925. The 1924 team was runner up in the SoCon tournament to the national champion North Carolina. He was also known as a cheerleader. Carter was "good at tip off, fast on his feet, and an accurate cager."

His son died from injuries sustained in basketball.

References

External links

1901 births
1950 deaths
Alabama Crimson Tide men's basketball players
Centers (basketball)
Basketball players from Alabama
American cheerleaders
People from Madison County, Alabama